Ole Olsen Amundrød (30 May 1771  – 24 March 1835) was a Norwegian farmer and schoolteacher. He served as a representative at the Norwegian Constitutional Assembly. 

Ole Olsen Amundrød was born on the farm Ousby (today Østby Søndre) at Tjølling in Vestfold, Norway. In 1801 he was appointed schoolmaster, a  position he retained until 1810. In 1808, he married Ingeborg Maria Kristoffersdatter (1791-1855). In 1813, the couple took over her family farm, Ommundrød in Tjølling. They also ran an inn on the farm. They were the parents of eight children.  After his death, his widow ran the farm until 1842 when she sold it to her son Ole Kristian Olsen and son in law Nils Nilsen.
  

Along with Iver Hesselberg and Anders Hansen Grønneberg, he was elected to represent Laurvigs Grevskab (now Larvik) at the Norwegian Constituent Assembly at Eidsvoll in  1814. All three delegates supported the position of the independence party (Selvstendighetspartiet).

References

Further reading
Holme Jørn (2014) De kom fra alle kanter - Eidsvollsmennene og deres hus  (Oslo: Cappelen Damm)

External links
Representantene på Eidsvoll 1814 (Cappelen Damm AS)
 Men of Eidsvoll (eidsvollsmenn)

1771 births
1835 deaths
People from Larvik
Fathers of the Constitution of Norway
Norwegian farmers